Fährmann or Faehrmann (meaning "ferryman") is a German surname. Notable people with the surname include:

Cate Faehrmann, Australian politician
Gerry Faehrmann, Owner of Lawn Green Pty Ltd and The Australian Institute Of Lawn Care Professionals
Christian Fährmann (born 1975), German footballer
Hans Fährmann (1860–1940), German composer and organist
Ralf Fährmann (born 1988), German footballer

See also
Fehrman

German-language surnames